Irsyad Maulana (born 27 September 1993) is an Indonesian professional footballer who plays as a winger or an attacking midfielder for Liga 1 club Persita Tangerang.

Career statistics

International

Honours

Club
Arema
 Indonesia Super League runner-up: 2013
 East Java Governor Cup: 2013
 Menpora Cup: 2013
 Indonesia President's Cup: 2022
Semen Padang
 Liga 2 runner-up: 2018

Individual
 Liga 1 Goal of the Month: September 2021

References

External links 
 
 

1993 births
Living people
Minangkabau people
Sportspeople from West Sumatra
Indonesian footballers
Indonesia international footballers
Liga 1 (Indonesia) players
Arema F.C. players
Semen Padang F.C. players
Persija Jakarta players
PSM Makassar players
Persita Tangerang players
Association football wingers